Reiner Goldberg (17 October 1939 in Crostau, Lusatia, Germany) is a German operatic heroic tenor.

After his vocal studies at the conservatory of music "Carl Maria von Weber" in Dresden, Goldberg made his debut 1967 in the Saxon Theatre (Sächsische Landesbühne) in Radebeul. A further station was the Sächsische Staatskapelle Dresden in 1973. In 1981, the tenor became a member of the Berlin State Opera ensemble.

At the beginning of the 1980s, Goldberg sang the important tenor parts of operas by Richard Wagner in nearly all leading opera houses in Europe and worldwide however his Bayreuth career started ignominiously. 
In 1983 Goldberg was contracted to sing both Siegfried Roles in the new production of the Ring Cycle at the Bayreuth Festival conducted by Sir Georg Solti and produced by Sir Peter Hall. This turned into a personal disaster for him as he could not learn the roles in time to the satisfaction of Solti and Hall and was replaced shortly before the first performances. He would, however be invited back to Bayreuth by Wolfgang Wagner in 1986 to sing Tannhäuser, Walther in Die Meistersinger in 1987 and in 1988 for Walther again and the Götterdämmerung Siegfried. In 1989 he would sing both Siegfried roles in the second Ring cycle of that summer's festival under Barenboim and would subsequently sing Erik in Der Fliegende Holländer there until 1994 under Sinopoli.

Among his other successes were Tannhäuser at the Berlin State Opera and Bavarian State Opera Munich, Erik (Der fliegende Holländer) at the Salzburg Easter Festival 1982 and 1983 conducted by Herbert von Karajan, Florestan and Tannhäuser at the Metropolitan Opera, both Siegfried roles at Covent Garden in 1991, and as Max (Der Freischütz) in the Zurich Opera. At the age of 61 he took on the role of the Kaiser in the Strauss Opera "Die Frau Ohne Schatten" with great success. He continued to sing with the State Opera in Berlin taking significant comprimario roles in Elektra and Salome up until 2015. Also in 2015 Daniel Barenboim had the idea of casting great Wagner singers of previous years as the various Masters in "Die Meistersinger von Nürnberg" Goldberg sang Eisslinger and reprised the role in 2018.
He sang the role of the first prisoner in Fidelio in a production in Graz in 2020 at age 80.

In concert, he sang in Beethoven's Ninth Symphony (Lucerne and Edinburgh) under Claudio Abbado. In 1995, Goldberg received the Special Music Award for the title role of Aron in a live recording of Schoenberg's Moses und Aron with the Tokyo Symphony under Maestro Kazuyoshi Akiyama at Suntory Hall in Tokyo.

Recordings
L. van Beethoven: 9th Symphony/Brilliant Classic 1974/ Gewandhaus Orchestra conducted by Kurt Masur/ Soloists: R. Goldberg a.o.
A. Schönberg: Moses und Aron/ 1976/Rundfunk-Sinfonie-Orchestra Leipzig conducted by Herbert Kegel / Soloists: Werner Haseleu, Reiner Goldberg
R. Wagner: Parsifal / Erato 1982/ Monte Carlo Orchestra under Armin Jordan/ Soloists: R. Goldberg, W. Schöne, R. Lloyd, Y. Minton
R. Strauss: Daphne/ EMI 1983, 1988/ Bayerischer Rundfunk Orchestra under Bernard Haitink/ Soloists: Lucia Popp, Reiner Goldberg, Kurt Moll
R. Strauss: Guntram / Hungaroton 1985 /Hungarian State Orchestra under Eve Queller/ Soloists: Reiner Goldberg, Ilona Tokody, István Gáti
R. Wagner:Die Walküre/ EMI 1988/ Bayrischer Rundfunk Orchestra under Bernard Haitink/ Soloist: R. Goldberg, Eva Marton, Cheryl Studer, Waltraud Meier, James Morris
R. Wagner: Siegfried / Deutsche Grammophon  1991/ Metropolitan Opera Orchestra under James Levine/ Soloists: Reiner Goldberg, James Morris, Hildegard Behrens
R. Wagner: Götterdämmerung/ Deutsche Grammophon  1991/ Metropolitan Opera Orchestra under James Levine/ Soloists: Reiner Goldberg, Hanna Schwarz, Hildegard Behrens/ This record received the Grammy Award 1992

Sources
Forbes, Elizabeth, "Goldberg, Reiner", Grove Music Online ed. L. Macy. Accessed 19 October 2009, (subscription access)
Fay, Stephen, "Anatomy of an Opera - The Ring" Secker and Warburg 1984
Bayreuth Festival Archives.

1939 births
Living people
People from Bautzen (district)
Jewish opera singers
German operatic tenors